Madatyphlops domerguei is a species of snake in the family Typhlopidae. The species is endemic to Madagascar.

Etymology
The specific name, domerguei, is in honor of French herpetologist Charles Domergue.

Geographic range
M. domerguei is found in southeastern Madagascar.

Habitat
The preferred natural habitat of M. domerguei is forest, at low and medium elevations.

Reproduction
M. domerguei is oviparous.

References

Further reading
Glaw F, Vences M (2006). A Field Guide to the Amphibians and Reptiles of Madagascar, Third Edition. Cologne, Germany: Vences & Glaw Verlag. 496 pp. .
Hedges SB, Marion AB, Lipp KM, Marin J, Vidal N (2014). "A taxonomic framework for typhlopid snakes from the Caribbean and other regions (Reptilia, Squamata)". Caribbean Herpetology (49): 1–61. (Madatyphlops domerguei, new combination).
Pyron RA, Wallach V (2014). "Systematics of the blindsnakes (Serpentes: Scolecophidia: Typhlopoidea) based on molecular and morphological evidence". Zootaxa 3829 (1): 001–081. (Lemuriatyphlops domerguei, new combination).
Roux-Estève R (1980). "Une nouvelle espèce de Typhlopidae (Serpentes) du Centre-Est de Madagascar : Typhlops domerguei". Bulletin du Muséum National d'Histoire Naturelle de Paris, Series 2, 1: 321–323. (Typhlops domerguei, new species). (in French).

domerguei
Snakes of Africa
Endemic fauna of Madagascar
Reptiles of Madagascar
Reptiles described in 1980